John Alton (October 5, 1901 – June 2, 1996), born Johann Jacob Altmann, in Sopron, Kingdom of Hungary, was an American cinematographer of Hungarian-German origin. Alton photographed some of the most famous films noir of the classic period and won an Academy Award for the cinematography of An American in Paris (1951), becoming the first Hungarian-born person to do so in the cinematography category.

Career
Alton moved to the US to attend college and first became involved in the film industry when he was spotted by a gateman at Cosmopolitan Studios in New York looking for extras. He began as a lab technician in Los Angeles in the 1920s, later becoming a cameraman within four years. He moved to France with Ernst Lubitsch to film backgrounds for The Student Prince in Old Heidelberg (1927) and ended up staying for one year heading the camera department of Paramount Pictures's Joinville Studios. He claimed he discovered Maurice Chevalier. In 1932, he moved to Argentina where he shot many Spanish-language films and designed the country's first sound film studio for Lumiton and Argentina Sono Film. He intended to stay for a year but ended up staying for seven. He won a prize for best photography in Argentina in 1937.

He returned to Hollywood in the late 1930s, and shot 30 B-movies in seven years, mostly for Republic Pictures and RKO. He then worked with director Anthony Mann to make T-Men (1947) and became one of the most sought-after cinematographers of the time being known for unconventional camera angles—especially low camera shots. His style is most notable in the films noir: He Walked by Night (1948), The Amazing Mr. X (1948), Raw Deal (1948) and The Big Combo (1955).

Alton also photographed many color movies including Slightly Scarlet (a color film noir). He worked with Vincente Minnelli at MGM for 10 years including on Father of the Bride (1950) and An American in Paris (1951), for which he won the Academy Award for Best Color Cinematography with Alfred Gilks. He also worked multiple times with Richard Brooks including on Battle Circus (1953) and The Brothers Karamazov (1958).

Alton resigned from the American Society of Cinematographers (ASC) in January 1944, reportedly due to conflicts with ASC founding member and MGM camera department head John Arnold. He was reinstated at his request less than a year later, with the help of Leon Shamroy, but ended up resigning a second and final time in March 1954 after a personal dispute with the president.

Alton's last film was Elmer Gantry (1960). He worked with director Charles Crichton on Birdman of Alcatraz (1962) but both were fired after two weeks and Alton quit the industry.

Television
In 1966, Alton shot the pilot for Mission: Impossible, which became a successful television series.

Book

Alton wrote Painting with Light (1949), one of the first books written by a working studio cinematographer. The book put forth several controversial theories for the day, such as depth is created by placing the brightest object in the scene furthest from the camera, and that studio lighting must always simulate natural light in texture and direction. It addresses both conventional and unconventional methods of studio motion-picture lighting. Despite the vast technical advances achieved within the motion picture industry much of the content is still pertinent. Painting with Light (1949) contains essential reading for any budding filmmaker with detailed information and ideas for lighting several difficult interior and exterior setups and situations. The table of contents includes chapters such as "Mystery Lighting", "Special Illumination", and "Visual Symphony".

Personal life
After quitting the movie industry, Alton and his wife Rozalia kept out of the public eye and traveled the world until the early 1980s living in Europe, South America, South Africa and Asia. They met while he was in Argentina and were married for 55 years until her death. In 1986, he married Billie, who died in the early 1990s.

Filmography 

 The Student Prince in Old Heidelberg (1927)
 The Man Who Murdered (1930)
  (1930)
 Los tres berretines (1933)
 El hijo de papá (1933)
 Crimen a las tres (1935)
 Big Calibre (1935)
 Escala en la ciudad (1935)
 Puerto Nuevo (1936)
 Compañeros (1936)
 Loco lindo (1936)
 Tararira (1936)
 Goal (1936)
 Amalia (1936)
 El Pobre Pérez (1937)
 Palermo (1937)
 La vida bohemia  (1938)
 Honeysuckle (1938)
 Puerta cerrada (1938)
 Cadetes de San Martín (1939)
 El último encuentro (1939)
 Caminito de Gloria (1939)
 Puerta cerrada (1939)
 Doce mujeres (1939)
 El matrero (1939)
 Remedy for Riches (1940)
 Dr. Christian Meets the Women (1940)
 Three Faces West (1940)
 The Courageous Dr. Christian (1940)
 The Devil Pays Off (1941)
 Forced Landing (1941)
 Melody for Three (1941)
 Power Dive (1941)
 Mr. District Attorney in the Carter Case (1941)
 The Affairs of Jimmy Valentine (1942)
 Ice-Capades Revue (1942)
 Johnny Doughboy (1942)
 Moonlight Masquerade (1942)
 Pardon My Stripes (1942)
 The Sultan's Daughter (1943)
 The Lady and the Monster (1944)
 Lake Placid Serenade (1944)
 Storm Over Lisbon (1944)
 Enemy of Women (1944)
 Atlantic City (1944)
 The Captain from Köpenick (1945)
 Girls of the Big House (1945)
 Song of Mexico (1944)
 Love, Honor and Goodbye (1945)
 I Was a Criminal (1945)
 Affairs of Geraldine (1946)
 A Guy Could Change (1946)
 The Madonna's Secret (1946)
 Murder in the Music Hall (1946)
 One Exciting Week (1946)
 The Magnificent Rogue (1947)
 The Ghost Goes Wild (1947)
 Hit Parade of 1947 (1947)
 T-Men (1947)
 The Trespasser (1947)
 Winter Wonderland (1947)
 Wyoming (1947)
 Bury Me Dead (1947)
 The Pretender (1947)
 Driftwood (1947)
 He Walked by Night (1948)
 Hollow Triumph (1948)
 The Amazing Mr. X (1948)
 Canon City (1948)
 Raw Deal (1948)
 Border Incident (1949)
 The Crooked Way (1949)
 Captain China (1949)
 Reign of Terror (1949)
 Red Stallion in the Rockies (1949)
 Mystery Street (1950)
 Father of the Bride (1950)
 Grounds for Marriage (1950)
 Devil's Doorway (1950)
 An American in Paris (1951) (ballet photography)
 The People Against O'Hara (1951)
 Father's Little Dividend (1951)
 It's a Big Country (1951)
 Talk About a Stranger (1952)
 Washington Story (1952)
 Apache War Smoke (1952)
 Count the Hours (1952)
 Battle Circus (1953)
 Take the High Ground! (1953)
 I, the Jury (1953)
 Cattle Queen of Montana (1954)
 Silver Lode (1954)
 Witness to Murder (1954)
 Duffy of San Quentin (1954)
 Passion (1954)
 Tennessee's Partner (1955)
 The Big Combo (1955)
  Pearl of the South Pacific (1955)
 Escape to Burma (1955)
 The Teahouse of the August Moon (1956)
 Slightly Scarlet (1956)
 The Catered Affair (1956)
 Tea and Sympathy (1956)
 Designing Woman (1957)
 The Brothers Karamazov (1958)
 Lonelyhearts (1958)
 12 to the Moon (1960)
 Elmer Gantry (1960)

Sources:

Accolades
Wins
 Academy Awards: Oscar, Best Cinematography, Color; An American in Paris, shared with: Alfred Gilks; 1951.

Nominations
 Laurel Awards: Golden Laurel, Top Cinematography, Color, The Brothers Karamazov, 4th place; 1959.

Other honors
 Los Angeles Film Critics Association Awards: Career Achievement Award; 1992.

References

Sources
 Harry Tomicek: Das grosse Schwarz. Border Incident, von Anthony Mann, Kamera: John Alton (1949). In: Christian Cargnelli, Michael Omasta (eds.): Schatten. Exil. Europäische Emigranten im Film noir. PVS, Vienna 1997. .

External links
 
 
 John Alton at Painting With Light
 John Alton images and analysis at Images Journal
 John Alton at Film Reference
  (7min:41secs)

1901 births
1996 deaths
American cinematographers
Best Cinematographer Academy Award winners
Hungarian cinematographers
Hungarian emigrants to the United States
People from Sopron
American expatriates in Argentina
American people of Hungarian descent